Kazimierz Dąbrowski (born 14 February 1936) is a Polish field hockey player. He competed in the men's tournament at the 1960 Summer Olympics.

References

External links
 

1936 births
Living people
Polish male field hockey players
Olympic field hockey players of Poland
Field hockey players at the 1960 Summer Olympics
People from Gniezno
Sportspeople from Greater Poland Voivodeship